James Monroe Williams (September 12, 1833 – February 15, 1907) was an American lawyer, soldier, and merchant. He served both as a cavalry and as an infantry officer in the Union Army within the Trans-Mississippi Theater during the American Civil War, and was breveted a brigadier general near the end of the conflict.

Williams also helped organize and was the initial commander of the 1st Kansas Colored Infantry Regiment, the first unit of USCT soldiers to see combat. Following the war, Williams remained a soldier until resigning in 1871 to become a rancher, then re-entered the service briefly about twenty years later, and afterwards became a merchant.

Early life
James M. Williams was born in 1833 in Lowville, New York, and later became a lawyer in that state.

Civil War service
On July 12, 1861, Williams entered the Union Army as a captain in the 5th Kansas Cavalry Regiment, and was appointed commander of Company F. The unit was organized at Leavenworth, Kansas, beginning that summer and into January of the following year. Williams and his regiment served in the Department of Kansas through June 1862, and then with the Department of Missouri that July.

Williams  resigned from the 5th Kansas Cavalry in the fall of 1862 to help organize and train the 1st Kansas Colored Infantry Regiment. The unit was raised that August at Fort Scott, Kansas, and he appointed its commander as a state militia colonel. He led his regiment into battle on October 29 during the Skirmish at Island Mound in Bates County, Missouri, the first instance of Union Army colored soldiers in action. He was commissioned a Union Army lieutenant colonel on January 13, 1863, when his regiment was federalized as the 79th Regiment Infantry U.S. Colored Troops. On May 2 Williams was promoted to the rank of colonel, and on July 1–2 he fought at the Battle of Cabin Creek in the Indian Territory. About two weeks later he led his regiment during the Battle of Honey Springs, and Williams was wounded in this fight.

In December 1863 Williams was assigned command of Roseville, Arkansas, in the District of the Frontier, Department of the Missouri, and he participated in the Camden Expedition in southern and central Arkansas from March 23 to May 2, 1864. He then exercised brigade command at various times in the District of the Frontier and in the VII Corps for the remainder of 1864 through the fall of 1865. Williams also fought at the Battle of Fort Smith in western Arkansas on July 31, 1864.

Postbellum
On October 1, 1865, Williams was mustered out of the volunteer service. He was commissioned a captain in the new 8th U.S. Cavalry Regiment of the regular army on July 28, 1866., commanding Company I. The 8th Cavalry was at first based out of Fort Whipple in the Arizona Territory, but later stationed at Fort Selden and Fort Bayard, both in the New Mexico Territory. Williams was brevetted a major on July 9, 1867, for his service during the Indian Wars. He resigned his commission on March 29, 1873, and took up work in the Colorado Territory as a rancher.

Williams re-entered the army nearly two decades later, joining the 7th U.S. Cavalry Regiment as a captain on January 7, 1891, and retired five days later to become a merchant.  Williams died in Washington, D.C., on February 15, 1907, and was buried with full military honors in Arlington National Cemetery in Virginia.

See also
List of American Civil War brevet generals (Union)jj

Notes

References
 Eicher, John H., and Eicher, David J., Civil War High Commands, Stanford University Press, 2001, .
 Hunt, Roger H., and Brown, John R., Brevet Brigadier Generals in Blue, Olde Soldier Books, 1990, revised 1997, .
 blogspot.com entry for Williams.
 kansasmemory.org entry for Williams.

Further reading
 Lull, Robert W., Civil War General and Indian Fighter James M. Williams: Leader of the 1st Kansas Colored Volunteer Infantry and the 8th U.S. Cavalry, University of North Texas Press, 2013, .

1833 births
1907 deaths
People of New York (state) in the American Civil War
Union Army colonels
People from Lowville, New York